Buried is a 2010 English-language Spanish survival thriller film directed by Rodrigo Cortés. It stars Ryan Reynolds and was written by Chris Sparling.

The story is about Iraq-based American civilian truck driver Paul Conroy (Ryan Reynolds), who, after being attacked, finds himself buried alive in a wooden coffin, with only a lighter, flask, flashlight, knife, glowsticks, pen, pencil, and a mobile phone. Since its premiere at the Sundance Film Festival, the film has received a positive critical reception.

Plot
In 2006, Paul Conroy, an American civilian working in Iraq, awakes to find himself buried in a wooden coffin with only a Zippo lighter, a pen, and a BlackBerry phone at hand. As he gradually begins to piece together what has happened to him, he recalls that he and several others were ambushed by terrorists, passing out after being hit by a rock. After calling 911 in Youngstown, Ohio, the FBI in Chicago, and his employer — none of whom help him — he receives a call from his kidnapper, Jabir, demanding that he pay a ransom of $5 million or he will be left in the coffin to die. Along with the script Paul is to read, Paul also finds a malfunctioning flashlight, a glow stick, a flask with alcohol, and a pocket knife.

Paul calls the State Department, which tells him that due to the government policy of not negotiating with terrorists, it will not pay the ransom but will attempt to rescue him. They connect him with Dan Brenner, head of the Hostage Working Group, who tells Paul they are working to find him, to conserve the Blackberry's battery life, and implores him not to make the video that Jabir has demanded. Brenner informs Paul that a man named Mark White was rescued from a similar situation three weeks prior and is now home safe with his family. Paul calls his mother, who is in a nursing home, but she barely remembers him due to severe dementia.

Jabir calls Paul again and demands he film a ransom video, sending a photo of his colleague, Pamela, gagged with a gun to her head. Paul insists that no one will pay $5 million, so Jabir drops the amount to $1 million. Paul finds a live snake in the coffin, which he is able to drive away through a hole in the wooden crate side with a fire from the alcohol. After switching the language on the Blackberry from Arabic to English, he finds the Blackberry's number, which he relays to his wife in a voicemail. Paul records the video, but the kidnappers execute Pamela anyway and send him a video of the murder. He calls Brenner, who is upset with him for making the video, which is now being played on all major networks and has received numerous views on YouTube.

Shortly afterward, distant explosions shake the area, which damage his coffin, causing it to slowly fill with sand. His employer's legal counsel calls him, asking him not to speak with anyone in order to keep the situation "contained". His employer then begins to record the call and informs him that he has been retroactively terminated from his job earlier that same day (before his capture) due to an alleged prohibited relationship with Pamela. Because of this, his company will not only not take any responsibility for his capture; additionally, he and his family will not be entitled to any benefits or pension earned with the company.

Brenner calls to report that the explosions that damaged his coffin earlier were in fact F-16 bombings and that his kidnappers may have been killed. Paul begins to lose hope and makes a last will and testament in video form, leaving his wife his personal savings and his son his clothes. Jabir calls demanding Paul video record himself cutting off a finger, threatening Paul’s family back home by revealing their home address. Paul complies with this demand.

Shortly after filming the video, his cell phone rings, and Paul begins to hear digging and distorted voices. The voices become clearer and the coffin opens. It is abruptly revealed that he hallucinated the encounter.

Brenner calls and tells Paul an insurgent has given details of where to find a man buried alive, and that they are driving out to rescue him. Paul then receives a tearful call from his wife Linda, and he assures her that he is going to be okay. As sand continues to fill the coffin to dangerous levels, giving Paul seconds left to live, Brenner calls and tells him that he and the rescue team have arrived at the burial site. Through the phone, digging is heard, but Paul cannot hear any digging around him. The team digs up a coffin and opens it, but it is revealed that the insurgent led them to the coffin of Mark White, the man Brenner claimed had been rescued.

Knowing that he is not going to be saved, Paul accepts his fate. Brenner profusely apologizes to Paul as the sand finally fills the coffin and he suffocates as the light goes out.

In a post-credits scene, a lighter illuminates the name "Mark White" on the lid of the coffin, written by Paul earlier.

Cast
 Ryan Reynolds as Paul Conroy
 José Luis García Pérez (voice) as Jabir
Robert Paterson (voice) as Dan Brenner
 Stephen Tobolowsky (voice) as Alan Davenport
 Cade Dundish (voice) as Shane Conroy
 Samantha Mathis (voice) as Linda Conroy
 Ivana Miño (voice) as Pamela Lutti
 Warner Loughlin (voice) as Maryanne Conroy / Donna Mitchell / number lady
 Erik Palladino (voice) as Special Agent Harris

Production
The film was produced by Barcelona-based Versus Entertainment, in association with The Safran Company and Dark Trick Films. It was shot in Barcelona over 16 days.

Lead actor Ryan Reynolds stated that he suffered from claustrophobia while filming (much like the character he plays). The coffin he was in was gradually filled with sand as filming went on such that he was actually buried while shooting the film's climactic moments. Ryan described the last day of shooting as "unlike anything I experienced in my life, and I never ever want to experience that again." The production crew had a team of paramedics waiting on standby.

Director Rodrigo Cortés' inspirations included the Alfred Hitchcock films Rope and Lifeboat.

Release
Buried premiered at the Sundance Film Festival on January 23, 2010. Lionsgate purchased the US and UK distribution rights to the film after a bidding war with other distributors including Screen Gems and Fox Searchlight Pictures.

The film received a limited theatrical release on September 24, 2010 and a wider release two weeks later on October 8, 2010. The film's first trailer premiered with A Nightmare on Elm Street. The second trailer premiered at the 2010 San Diego Comic-Con International, and was attached with select prints of Dinner for Schmucks, Resident Evil: Afterlife, The Expendables and The Last Exorcism.

The film won the best European feature film of the year award at the Strasbourg European Fantastic Film Festival in September 2010.

The film was presented at the Deauville American Film Festival, in competition, and the Toronto International Film Festival, out of competition, in September 2010.

Critical reception
On review aggregation website Rotten Tomatoes, the film holds an approval rating of 87% based on 157 reviews with an average rating of 7.3/10. The site's critics consensus reads: "Wringing a seemingly impossible amount of gripping drama out of its claustrophobic premise, Buried is a nerve-wracking showcase for Ryan Reynolds' talent." Metacritic assigned the film a weighted average score of 65 out of 100 based on 29 critics, indicating "generally favorable reviews".

Film critic Roger Ebert awarded the film three and a half out of four stars and wrote that "Rodrigo Cortés, the Spanish filmmaker behind this diabolical, Hitchcock-influenced narrative stunt, makes merry mischief with camera angles and lighting". Scott Mantz of Access Hollywood called it "a brilliantly twisted suspense thriller that would have made Alfred Hitchcock proud." Chris Tilly at IGN gave the film a perfect 10 out of 10.

Peter Travers of Rolling Stone awarded the film two out of four stars, commenting: "Ninety minutes of being buried alive with Ryan Reynolds: Didn't we all suffer that in The Proposal?"

Industry reception
Celebrities across the film industry lauded the film and have cited it as one of their favorite films, including Nick Park, Peter Lord, Todd Haynes, Terry Gilliam, Luc Besson, Guillermo del Toro, Tom Tykwer, Neil Marshall, Pedro Almodóvar, James Gunn, Edgar Wright, David Cronenberg, Luca Guadagnino, Ruairí Robinson, Quentin Tarantino, The Wachowskis, Ralph Fiennes, Daniel Radcliffe, Josh Hartnett, Freddie Highmore, Nicolas Cage, Jason Sudeikis, Brendan Fraser, Ben Whishaw, Alan Rickman, Alistair Petrie, Cate Blanchett, Charlize Theron, Emma Corrin, Tilda Swinton, Romola Garai, Rosie O'Donnell, Gemma Arterton, Fenella Woolgar, Aisha Tyler and Julie Andrews.

Film director John Waters named Buried as one of the ten best films of 2010 stating "The most excruciatingly painful date movie imaginable comes complete with a very smart feel-bad ending. See it with someone you hate."

Accolades

See also
 Survival film, about the film genre, with a list of related films

References

External links
 
 
 
 
 

2010 psychological thriller films
2010 independent films
Spanish thriller films
English-language Spanish films
Films about mobile phones
Films about terrorism
Films set in Iraq
Films set in 2006
Films shot in Barcelona
Films shot in Spain
Iraq War films
Studio 37 films
Kinology films
Icon Productions films
Scanbox Entertainment films
2010s survival films
Lionsgate films
Films directed by Rodrigo Cortés
2010s English-language films
2010s Spanish films
Spanish psychological thriller films